Ludwig van Beethoven's Minuet in G major, WoO 10, No. 2 is a composition originally written for orchestra, but was lost and only an arrangement for piano could be found. It has become very popular.

Structure
The minuet is in incipient ternary form, A-A-B-A, a type of song form as differentiated from other, such as the binary song form in the format A-B, the ternary A-B-A, or the rondo, A-B-A-C-A or an alternate form but with the "A" theme repeating after each new theme in the sequence of themes. In terms of A-B-A sections, the three parts are:
Moderato
Trio
Moderato
The Moderato section features a melody, marked legato (to play in a smooth, even style without noticeable breaks between the notes). Quarter notes occupy most of the left hand in this A section, which is made up of two periods. The first four-measure (a) phrase is in the tonic of G Major; the second four-measure (b) phrase modulates from the tonic to the dominant of D Major.

This period, the main theme of the piece, is repeated once. Next comes the second period which consists of a four-measure (c) phrase with a different melody and modulates back into the tonic for the final four-measures, which begins and ends in G Major. This phrase is a variation of (a) so as to stay in the tonic, so must be designated (a-1) to make this and other slight alterations clear. It is still very recognizable as the (a) thematic music.

The trio section features non-stop eighth notes in the right hand and, once again, quarter notes in the left hand. It starts with an eight-measure modulating passage repeated once and moves on to another eight-measure passage that ends in the tonic, and is also repeated once. This passage contains four harmonious measures that are followed by a varied reiteration of the theme in the trio part (which is played in the first eight-measure passage). The section, without going into as much detail as is shown above for the legato section (although this could be done) is thus in binary song form.

The last section, which is Moderato also, is a repeat of the first section, but without the repeat. It is that which makes the piece an incipient ternary song form: A-A-B-A.

In popular culture
In The Music Man, the children of River City learn the Minuet in G via the "Think Method" taught by Professor Harold Hill. It was also the inspiration for the theme of the British sitcom Fawlty Towers. It appears in the Shirley Temple film The Littlest Rebel (1935). It is the opening-credits song of the 1937 short A Car-Tune Portrait. In the Columbo episode "A Bird in the Hand ..." (1992), an orchestral version of this minuet plays softly in the background during the Rolls-Royce dealership scene.

External links
Minuet orchestral performance by the Philadelphia Orchestra
Minuet free scores at IMSLP

Compositions by Ludwig van Beethoven